Livingstone County is one of the 141 Cadastral divisions of New South Wales. The Darling River is the western and north-western boundary, near Menindee.

Livingstone County was named in honour after the African missionary and explorer David Livingstone (1813-1873).

Parishes within this county
A full list of parishes found within this county; their current LGA and mapping coordinates to the approximate centre of each location is as follows:

References

Counties of New South Wales